Laura Nicole Figueroa Alemán  (born March 8, 1987) is a Puerto Rican actress and singer.

Life and career 
Born in Ponce, Puerto Rico and raised on the island, Laura Alemán began her artistic career at a very early age. Working with her family in theater plays, TV & music recording studios, Laura fell in love with acting, singing and dancing. She trained in numerous specialized schools and immersed herself in her craft. In addition, Laura received a Bachelor of Fine Arts (BFA) in dramatic arts at Hunter College in New York, and a Bachelor of Arts (BA) in Film Production at the Sacred Heart University of Puerto Rico.  She was also awarded a scholarship to further develop her craft at the foundationFundación José Ortega y Gasset in Toledo, Spain.

Laura has starred  in films that have been broadcast in 225 countries around the world and has participated in more than 48 film productions. Her most recent projects include: Extraterrestres (Amazon), Sol De Medianoche (HBO), Cleaners (Crackle) and Amor en 266 Millas (a film premiering in 2021). Furthermore, she has won multiple awards for her work, including: Best Actress for her leading role in the short film "El Gran Elefante" at Cinefiesta International Film Festival, LUSCA Fantastic Film Fest  and the Rincon International Film Festival. Laura also formed part of the writer's room for the Series Santurce (pre-production) and is currently working on her first music album.

Filmography 

Zona Y – Natalia (Antagonist) (2004–2011)
Lucia,Ignacio y otras historias – Cristi (2007)
Medio Minuto – (Supporting Role) (2009)
El Talismán (2012)
Pacto de Silencio (2012)
Runner Runner – (Supporting Role) (2012)
Pasión de Mil Amores (2013)
Rosario (2013)
El Capo – (Supporting Role) (2013)
Cleaners – Matilda (Co-Lead) (2013)
Desde La Tina – (Lead Role) (2014)
El Gran Elefante – (Lead Role) (2014)
Cuentos de Ada – (Lead Role) (2014)
Chamacas Comedy – (Series Regular) (2015)
Extraterrestres – (Supporting Role) (2015)
Cristina Bazan: El Verdadero Final – (Supporting Role) (2015)
Sol De Medianoche – (Supporting Role) (2016)
Snowbound – (Co-Lead) (2016)
Start Up – (Supporting Role) (2017)
Amor En 266 Millas – (Supporting Role) (2017)
The Unnamable – (Supporting Role) (2017)
La Celebración – (Supporting Role) (2018)

Web 
Cleaners (CRACKLE Co-Lead) (2014)
Fragmentos de Amor – (NETFLIX Supporting Role) (2013)
Extraterrestres – (AMAZON Supporting Role) (2015)
Chamacas Comedy – (YOUTUBE Series Regular) (2015)
Sol De Medianoche – (HBO LATINO Supporting Role) (2017)
StartUP – (CRACKLE Supporting Role) (2017)

Short films 
Sorpresa – Laura (2010)
Me Quiero Casar – Alana (2014)

Television 
TRIBUNA TV – MÁS MADERA (Host & Editor)
WAPA TV/WAPA AMERICA – De Pelicula (Presenter & Entertainer) (2010)
Univision/Telefutura – Protagonistas (Participant/Winner of Reality) (2011)
Univision/Telefutura – Noche de Perros (Special Guest of The Program) (2011)
Univision/Telefutura – Despierta America (Special Guest of The Program) (2011)
Univision/Telefutura – La Tijera (Special Guest of The Program) (2011)
Univision Puerto Rico – Locas De Atar (Special Guest of The Program) (2011)
Univision Puerto Rico – Adrenalina Sin Frenos (Special Guest of The Program) (2011)

Video clips 
Divino – Conmigo Siempre (2010)
Como La Flor – Imitation on Protagonistas (2011)
Manny Manuel – El Peor de mis Fracasos (2012)

Commercial Courts 
Burger King
University System Ana G. Méndez
Radio Shack
MC Donald
Autoridad De Transito
Pan Pepin
Medalla Light (2010)
T-Mobile (2010)
Banco Popular – DESICIONES (2010)

Singles 
Sin Ti (2010)
Sin Ti – Laura & Marissa Aleman (2010)

Puerto Rico Beauty Contest
Miss Puerto Rico Petite – 1st Runner Up San German (2011)

Theatre 
Preso yo... Humm (2010)
Laberinto Sin Salida – La Tacon Dorado (2012)

References 

Living people
Puerto Rican telenovela actresses
Participants in American reality television series
21st-century Puerto Rican actresses
1987 births